John Michael McDonagh (born 7 November 1967) is a screenwriter and film director with Irish and British nationality. He wrote and directed The Guard (2011) and Calvary (2014), both films starring Brendan Gleeson, receiving a BAFTA Award nomination for the former. He was born in London in 1967. He is the older brother of playwright and filmmaker Martin McDonagh.

Early life 
McDonagh was born in London in 1967. He was raised in England with his younger brother, playwright and filmmaker Martin McDonagh, although they spent their summers in his mother's Irish hometown of Easky, County Sligo, which was the setting for Calvary. Like his brother, McDonagh dropped out of secondary school, and ended up unemployed. He pursued a career as a writer and, after writing several unpublished novels, decided to try writing for film.

Film career 
McDonagh made his first foray into writing and directing with The Second Death, a short film released in 2000, which his brother served as executive producer for. Next McDonagh adapted Robert Drewe's 1991 novel Our Sunshine into the screenplay for the 2003 film Ned Kelly, which was directed by Gregor Jordan.

McDonagh gained considerable attention in 2011, with the theatrical release of his feature film directorial debut The Guard, starring Brendan Gleeson and Don Cheadle. The film received critical acclaim, and went on to become the most financially successful independent Irish film of all time. Among several honours, McDonagh was nominated for the BAFTA Award for Best Original Screenplay. He followed this up in 2014 with Calvary, a blackly comic drama about a good priest tormented by his community. The film also starred Gleeson as the main character.

McDonagh returned to the crime comedy genre for his 2016 feature, War on Everyone, which stars Alexander Skarsgård and Michael Peña as a pair of intractable Albuquerque police detectives. His fourth feature, The Forgiven, was released in 2022.

Future projects

McDonagh has mentioned numerous forthcoming projects, including an adaptation of Percival Everett's novel Assumption, The Bonnot Gang, a period gangster film based on the true story of a group of French anarchist bank robbers who operated before World War I, and Chaos Inc, a television series about a Buddhist private investigator based in Las Vegas.

In 2014 McDonagh spoke of plans to end the "trilogy" begun with  The Guard and Calvary, reteaming him with star Brendan Gleeson. The film, titled The Lame Shall Enter First, will follow a paraplegic ex-policeman in London who has developed a hatred for able-bodied people and who gets caught up in a new investigation after one of his friends is murdered. It is intended to be an amalgamation of themes and tones present in his first two directorial features.

Filmography

Film

Short film 
 (2000) The Second Death – Writer/Director

Screenwriter 
 (2003) Ned Kelly – Writer

References

External links
 

Living people
People from Camberwell
English screenwriters
English male screenwriters
English people of Irish descent
Film directors from London
Writers from London
1967 births